Calytrix harvestiana is a species of plant in the myrtle family Myrtaceae that is endemic to Western Australia.

It usually blooms between September and December producing purple-pink star-shaped flowers.

Found on flats in an area along the west coast of the Mid West region of Western Australia where it grows on sandy soils.
 
The species was first formally described as Lhotzkya harvestiana by the botanist Ferdinand von Mueller in 1878 in the work Fragmenta Phytographiae Australiae. It was reclassified in the genus Calytrix by Lyndley Craven in 1987 in the article A taxonomic revision of Calytrix Labill. (Myrtaceae) in the journal Brunonia.

References

harvestiana
Endemic flora of Western Australia
Rosids of Western Australia
Vulnerable flora of Australia
Plants described in 1987
Taxa named by Ferdinand von Mueller